The Broxbourne Council election, 2003 was held to elect council members of the Broxbourne Borough Council, the local government authority of the borough of Broxbourne,  Hertfordshire, England.

Composition of expiring seats before election

Election results

Results summary 
An election was held in all of the 13 wards on 1 May 2003.

The British National Party gained 1 seat from the Conservative Party in Rosedale Ward

The new political balance of the council following this election was:

Conservative 34 seats
Labour 2 seats
Independent 1 seat
British National Party 1 seat

Ward results

References

2003
2003 English local elections
2000s in Hertfordshire